Countess Ilona Zrínyi (Croatian: Jelena Zrinska, Hungarian: Zrínyi Ilona) (1643, Ozalj – 18 February 1703, Izmit) was a noblewoman and heroine. She was one of the last surviving members of the Croatian-Hungarian Zrinski/Zrínyi noble family. She was the daughter of Petar Zrinski, Ban (viceroy) of Croatia, the niece of both Miklós Zrínyi and Fran Krsto Frankopan and the wife of Francis Rákóczi I and Imre Thököly, as well as the mother of Francis Rákóczi II. She is remembered in history for her Defense of Palanok Castle against the Imperial army in 1685-1688, an act for which she was regarded a heroine in Hungary.

Life

Early years and family
Ilona was born Ilona Zrínyi in Ozalj, present day Croatia. She was the eldest child of Croatian Ban, Peter Zrinyi, and his wife Katarina Zrinyi née Frankopan, a Croatian poet. Later her parents had two daughters, Judita Petronila (1652-1699), and Aurora Veronika (1658-1735), as well as a son, Ivan Antun (1651-1703). Ilona and her siblings were the last generation of descendants of the once-powerful Zrinski family.

From her childhood, she was known for her beauty and good education. There is little information on her schooling; it is known though that she acquired a high level of knowledge within her family, not only from her father and mother, Croatian writers and erudite persons but from her uncle Nikola VII Zrinski as well.

Marriages
On 1 March 1666, she married Francis Rákóczi, with whom she had three children: György, born in 1667, who died in infancy; Julianna, born in 1672; and Ferenc (commonly known as Francis Rákóczi II), born in 1676. On June 8, 1676, not long after Francis II's birth, the elder Francis died. The widowed Ilona requested guardianship of her children and was granted it, against the advice of Emperor Leopold I's advisers and against Francis I's will. In this way she also retained control over the vast Rákóczi estates, which included among them the castles of Regéc, Sárospatak, Makovica, and Munkács. In 1682 she married Imre Thököly and became an active partner in her second husband's Kuruc uprising against the Habsburgs.

Defense of Munkács (Palanok) Castle
After their defeat at the 1683 Battle of Vienna, both the Ottoman forces and Thököly's allied Kuruc fighters had no choice but to retreat, and Thököly quickly lost one Rákóczi castle after another. At the end of 1685, the Imperial army surrounded the last remaining stronghold, Munkacs Castle in today's Ukraine. Ilona Zrínyi alone defended the castle for three years (1685–1688) against the forces of General Antonio Caraffa.

Internment, exile and death
After the recapture of Buda, the situation became untenable, and on 17 January 1688, Ilona had no choice but to surrender the castle, with the understanding that the defenders would receive amnesty from the Emperor, and that the Rákóczi estates would remain in her children's name. Under this agreement, she and her children traveled immediately to Vienna, where in violation of the pact the children were taken from her. Ilona lived until 1691 in the convent of the Ursulines, where her daughter Julianna was also raised. Her son Francis was immediately taken to the Jesuit school in Neuhaus.

At the time, her husband, Thököly, was still fighting with his Kuruc rebels against the Habsburg army in Upper Hungary. When Habsburg General Heisler was captured by Thököly, a prisoner exchange was arranged, and Ilona joined her husband in Transylvania. In 1699, however, after the Treaty of Karlowitz was signed, both spouses, having found themselves on the losing side, had to go into exile in the Ottoman Empire. The countess lived in Galata, district of Constantinople, and later in Izmit, where she died on 18 February 1703. She was buried in the French church of Saint Benoit in Galata.

Descendants
From her first marriage with Francis Rákóczi, Ilona had three children:
György (1667–1667)
Julianna Borbála (September 1672 – 1717); married Count Ferdinand Gobert von Aspremont-Lynden (1643-1708)
Francis II (27 March 1676 – 8 April 1735)

From her second marriage with Imre Thököly, Ilona had three children, all of whom died at a young age (including one she was pregnant with during the siege of Munkács).

Legacy
Ilona Zrínyi is celebrated in Croatia and Hungary as one of the greatest national heroines, patriots and fighters for freedom, who opposed, although unsuccessfully, the autocracy and absolutism aspirations of the Habsburgs. Her even more famous son Francis II Rákóczi continued the struggle for the independence of Hungary (1703–1711).

In October 1906 the remains of the Croatian countess were reinterred with her son's in the St Elisabeth Cathedral in present-day Košice, Slovakia.

Honors
 Postage stamp issued by Hungary on 28 September 1952.

See also
House of Zrinski
Zrinski family tree
Zrinski–Frankopan conspiracy
Kuruc
Rákóczi's War for Independence
Wesselényi conspiracy

References

Further reading
Sources in English:
Clayton, Ellen Creathorne/Needham, Female Warriors: Memorials of Female Valour and Heroism, from the Mythological Ages to the Present Era, 2 vols (London: Tinsley, 1879), I, 218–220
Ogden, Alan: The Discontented: Betrayal, Love and War in Habsburg Hungary (Orchid Press 2005)
Sources in Hungarian:
Köpeczi Béla – R. Várkonyi Ágnes: II. Rákóczi Ferenc. 3. javított kiadás Bp., 2004. Osiris Kiadó.
 Gyöngyösi István: Thököly Imre és Zrínyi Ilona házassága + Palinódia (Kesergõ nimfa) (Balassi Kiadó Kft., 2000)
 Szentmihályiné Szabó Mária: Zrínyi Ilona (Kriterion Könyvkiadó, 1994)
 Passuth László: Sasnak körme között (Athenaeum 2000 Kiadó)

External links

 Jelena Zrinska Medal
 
 Medjimurje County tourism page

Ilona
1640s births
Croatian nobility
Hungarian nobility
17th-century Croatian women
People from Ozalj
1703 deaths
Croatian Roman Catholics
Hungarian Roman Catholics
Women in 17th-century warfare
Women in European warfare
17th-century Hungarian women